The name Saomai was used for two tropical cyclones in the northwestern Pacific Ocean. The name is the Vietnamese name for the planet Venus (Sao Mai – "morning star").

 Typhoon Saomai (2000) (T0014, 22W, Osang) - a Category 5 super typhoon impacted Japan and Korean peninsula.
 Typhoon Saomai (2006) (T0608, 08W, Juan) – a Category 5 super typhoon that caused 458 deaths in the Philippines and China.

"Saomai" was retired by the ESCAP/WMO Typhoon Committee following the 2006 typhoon season, and was replaced with "Son-Tinh".

Pacific typhoon set index articles